Al Egtmaaey Sporting Club, known as Egtmaaey Tripoli or simply Egtmaeey, is a football club based in Tripoli, Lebanon, that competes in the .

Club rivalries 
Egtmaaey plays the Tripoli derby, also known as the North derby, with AC Tripoli as they are both located in the same city.

Honours 
 Lebanese Second Division
Winners (3): 1991–92, 2011–12, 2014–15
 Lebanese Third Division
Winners (1): 2006–07

See also 
 List of football clubs in Lebanon

References

External links 
Soccerway Profile

Al Egtmaaey SC
Football clubs in Lebanon